This is a list of the Patriarchs of Constantinople.

Bishops of Byzantium (until 330) 
1. St. Andrew the Apostle (38), founder 
2. St. Stachys the Apostle (38–54)
3. St. Onesimus (54–68)
4. Polycarpus I (69–89)
5. Plutarch (89–105)
6. Sedecion (105–114)
7. Diogenes (114–129)
8. Eleutherius (129–136)
9. Felix (136–141)
10. Polycarpus II (141–144)
11. Athenodorus (144–148)
12. Euzois (148–154)
13. Laurence (154–166)
14. Alypius (166–169)
15. Pertinax (169–187)
16. Olympianus (187–198)
17. Mark I or Marcus I (198–211)
18. Philadelphus (211–217)
19. Cyriacus I (217–230)
20. St. Castinus (230–237)
21. Eugenius I (237–242)
22. Titus (242–272)
23. Dometius (272–284)
24. Rufinus I (284–293)
25. Probus (293–306)
26. St. Metrophanes (306–314)
27. St. Alexander (314–337)

Archbishops of Constantinople (330–451) 
28. St. Paul I ("the Confessor") (337–339)
29. Eusebius of Nicomedia (339–341)
Paul I (341–342), restored 1st time
30. Macedonius I (342–346)
Paul I (346–350), restored 2nd time
Macedonius I (351–360), restored
31. Eudoxius of Antioch (360–370)
Florentius (c. 363)
32. Demophilus (370–380)
33. Evagrius (370 or 379)
34. Maximus I (380)
35. St. Gregory I of Nazianzus the Theologian (380–381)
36. St. Nectarius (381–397)
37. St. John Chrysostom (398–404)
38. St. Arsacius (404–405)
39. St. Atticus (406–425)
40. St. Sisinnius I (426–427)
41. Nestorius (428–431)
42. St. Maximianus (431–434)
43. St. Proclus (434–446)
44. St. Flavian or Flavianus (446–449), also Flavian I
45. St. Anatolius (449–458) (Patriarch from 451)

Patriarchs of Constantinople (since 451)

451–998 
46. St. Gennadius I (458–471)
47. Acacius (471–488)
48. Fravitta (488–489), also Flavian II
49. Euphemius (489–495)
50. St. Macedonius II (495–511)
51. Timothy I (511–518)
52. St. John II the Cappadocian (518–520)
53. St. Epiphanius (520–535)
54. Anthimus I (535–536)
55. St. Menas (536–552)
56. St. Eutychius (552–565)
57. St. John III Scholasticus (565–577)
Eutychius (577–582), restored
58. St. John IV Nesteutes (582–595)
59. St. Cyriacus II (596–606)
60. St. Thomas I (607–610)
61. Sergius I (610–638)
62. Pyrrhus I (638–641)
63. Paul II (641–653)
Pyrrhus I (653–654), restored
64. Peter (654–666)
65. St. Thomas II (667–669)
66. St. John V (669–675)
67. St. Constantine I (675–677)
68. St. Theodore I (677–679)
69. St. George I (679–686)
70. St. Paul III (687–693)
71. St. Callinicus I (693–705)
72. St. Cyrus (705–711)
73. John VI (712–715)
74. St. Germanus I (715–730)
75. Anastasius (730–754)
76. Constantine II (754–766)
77. Nicetas I (766–780)
78. St. Paul IV (780–784)
79. St. Tarasius (784–806)
80. St. Nicephorus I (806–815)
81. Theodotus I Kassiteras (815–821)
82. Antony I (821–836)

83. John VII Grammaticus (836–843)
84. St. Methodius I (843–847)
85. St. Ignatius I (847–858)
86. St. Photios I the Great (858–867)
St. Ignatius I (867–877), restored
St. Photios I the Great (877–886), restored
87. St. Stephen I (886–893)
88. St. Antony II Kauleas (893–901)
89. St. Nicholas I Mystikos (901–907)
90. St. Euthymius I Synkellos (907–912)
St. Nicholas I Mystikos (912–925), restored
91. St. Stephen II of Amasea (925–928)
92. St. Tryphon, also Tryphonius (928–931)
93. Theophylactus (933–956)
94. St. Polyeuctus (956–970)
95. Basil I Scamandrenus (970–974)
96. Antony III the Studite (974–980)
97. St. Nicholas II Chrysoberges (984–991)
98. Sisinnius II (996–999)

999–1453 
99. St. Sergius II (1001–1019)
100. St. Eustathius (1019–1025)
101. Alexius I the Studite (1025–1043)
102. Michael I Cerularius (1043–1058)
103. St. Constantine III Leichoudes (1058–1063)
104. St. John VIII Xiphilinos (1063–1075)
105. St. Kosmas I (1075–1081)
106. Eustratius Garidas (1081–1084)
107. Nicholas III Grammaticus (1084–1111)
108. John IX Agapetus (1111–1134)
109. St. Leo Styppeiotes (1134–1143)
110.  St. Michael II Kourkouas (1143–1146)
111. Cosmas II Atticus (1146–1147)
112. Nicholas IV Muzalon (1147–1151)
113. Theodotus II (1151–1153)
114. Neophytos I (1153–1154)
115. Constantine IV Chliarenus (1154–1156)
116. Luke Chrysoberges (1156–1169)
117. Michael III of Anchialus (1169–1177)
118. Chariton (1177–1178)
119. Theodosius I Boradiotes (1178–1183)
120. Basil II Kamateros (1183–1186)
121. Niketas II Mountanes (1186–1189)
122. Dositheus (1189) (9 days)
123. Leo Theotokites (1189)
Dositheus (1189–1191), restored
124. George II Xiphilinos (1191–1198)
125. John X Kamateros (1198–1206)
126. Michael IV Autoreianos (1206–1212, patriarch-in-exile at Nicaea)
127. Theodore II Eirenikos (1214–1216, Nicaean)
128. Maximos II (1216, Nicaean)
129. Manuel I Karantenos Charitopoulos (1216–1222, Nicaean)
130. Germanus II (1223–1240, Nicaean)
131. Methodius II (1240, Nicaean)
vacant (1240–1244, Nicaean)
132. Manuel II (1244–1255, Nicaean)
133. St. Arsenius Autoreianus (1255–1259, Nicaean)
134. Nicephorus II (1260–1261, last Nicaean patriarch-in-exile)
Arsenius Autoreianus (1261–1265), restored
135. Germanus III (1266)
136. St. Joseph I Galesiotes (1266–1275)
137. John XI Bekkos (1275–1282)
 Joseph I Galesiotes (1282–1283), restored
138. Gregory II Cyprius (1283–1289)
139. St. Athanasius I (1289–1293)
140. John XII (1293–1303)
Athanasius I (1303–1310), restored
141. Nephon I (1310–1314)
142. John XIII Glykys (1314–1320)
143. Gerasimos I (1320–1321)
144. Isaias (1321–1334)
145. John XIV Kalekas (1334–1347)
146. Isidore I (1347–1350)
147. St. Callistus I (1350–1354)
148. Philotheus Kokkinos (1354–1355)
Callistus I (1355–1363), restored
Philotheus Kokkinos (1363–1376), restored
149. Macarius (1376–1379)
150. Nilus Kerameus (1379–1388)
151. Antony IV (1388–1390)
Macarius (1390–1391), restored
Antony IV (1391–1397), restored
152. St. Callistus II Xanthopoulos (1397)
153. Matthew I (1397–1410)
154. Euthymius II (1410–1416)
155. Joseph II (1416–1439)
156. Metrophanes II (1439–1443)
157. Gregory III Mammas (1443–1450)
158. Athanasius II (1450–1453)

On May 29, 1453 occurred the Fall of Constantinople, thus marking the end of the Byzantine Empire. The Ecumenical Patriarchate became subject to the Ottoman Empire.

1453–1466 
159. Gennadius II Scholarios (1454–1456)
160. Isidore II Xanthopoulos (1456–1462)
There are different suggestions by scholars for the succession of the Patriarchs from 1462 to 1466. The main positions are the following:

According to Kiminas (2009):
161. Joasaph I, Apr 1462 – Apr 1463
Gennadius II, Apr 1463 – June 1463
162. Sophronius I, Jun 1463 – Aug 1464
Gennadius II, Aug 1464 – aut. 1465
163. Mark II, aut. 1465 – aut. 1466
164. Symeon I, au. 1466 – end 1466

According to Laurent (1968):
161. Joasaph I, Apr 1462 – Apr 1463
Gennadius II, Apr 1463 – May 1463
162. Sophronius I, May 1463 – July 1464
Gennadius II, Aug 1464 – aut. 1465
163. Symeon I, autumn 1465
164. Mark II, beg. 1466 – aut. 1466

According to Gemanos of Sardeis (1933–38):
Gennadius II, sum. 1462 – sum. 1463
161. Sophronius I, Aug 1463 – Aug 1464
Gennadius II, Aug 1464 – aut. 1464
162. Joasaph I, beg. 1465 – beg. 1466
163. Mark II, beg. 1466 – mid 1466
164. Symeon I, mid 1466 – end 1466

1466–1833 
165. St. Dionysius I (end 1466–1471)
Symeon I of Trebizond (1471–1475), restored 1st time
166. Raphael I (1475–1476)
167. St. Maximus III (1476–1482)
Symeon I of Trebizond (1482–1486), restored 2nd time
168. Nephon II (1486–1488)
Dionysius I (1488–1490), restored
169. Maximus IV (1491–1497)
Nephon II (1497–1498), restored 1st time
170. Joachim I (1498–1502)
Nephon II (1502), restored 2nd time
171. Pachomius I (1503–1504)
Joachim I (1504), restored
Pachomius I (1504–1513), restored
172. Theoleptus I (1513–1522)
173. Jeremias I (1522–1524)
174. Joannicius I (1524–1525)
Jeremias I (1525–1546), restored
175. Dionysius II (1546–1556)
176. Joasaph II (1556–1565)
177. Metrophanes III (1565–1572)
178. Jeremias II Tranos (1572–1579)
Metrophanes III (1579–1580), restored
Jeremias II Tranos (1580–1584), restored 1st time
179. Pachomius II (1584–1585)
180. Theoleptus II (1585–1586)
Jeremias II Tranos (1587–1595), restored 2nd time
181. Matthew II (1596)
182. Gabriel I (1596)
 Theophanes I Karykes (locum tenens, 1596)
 Meletius I Pegas (locum tenens, 1597)
183. Theophanes I Karykes (1597)
184. Meletius I Pegas (locum tenens, 1597–1598)
Matthew II (1598–1602), restored 1st time
185. Neophytus II (1602–1603)
Matthew II (1603), restored 2nd time
186. Raphael II (1603–1607)
Neophytus II (1607–1612), restored
187. Cyril I Lucaris (locum tenens, 1612)
188. Timothy II (1612–1620)
Cyril I Lucaris (1620–1623), restored 1st time
189. Gregory IV (1623)
190. Anthimus II (1623)
Cyril I Lucaris (1623–1633), restored 2nd time
191. Cyril II Kontares (1633)
Cyril I Lucaris (1633–1634), restored 3rd time
192. Athanasius III Patelaros (1634)
Cyril I Lucaris (1634–1635), restored 4th time
Cyril II Kontares (1635–1636), restored 1st time
193. Neophytus III of Nicaea (1636–1637)
Cyril I Lucaris (1637–1638) restored 5th time
Cyril II Kontares (1638–1639), restored 2nd time
194. Parthenius I (1639–1644)
195. Parthenius II (1644–1646)
196. Joannicius II (1646–1648)
Parthenius II (1648–1651), restored
Joannicius II (1651–1652), restored 1st time
197. Cyril III (1652–1652)
Athanasius III (1652), restored
198. Paisius I (1652–1653）
Joannicius II (1653–1654), restored 2nd time
Cyril III (1654), restored
Paisius I (1654-1655), restored
Joannicius II (1655–1656), restored 3rd time
199. St. Parthenius III (1656–1657)
200. Gabriel II (1657)
201. Parthenius IV (1657–1659)
202. Theophanes II (1659)
vacant (1659–1662)
203. Dionysius III (1662–1665)
Parthenius IV (1665–1667), restored 1st time
204. Clement (1667)
205. Methodius III (1668–1671)
Parthenius IV (1671), restored 2nd time
206. Dionysius IV Muselimes (1671–1673)
207. Gerasimus II (1673–1674)
Parthenius IV (1675–1676) restored 3rd time
Dionysius IV Muselimes (the Muslim) (1676–1679), restored 1st time
208. Athanasius IV (1679)
209. James (1679–1682)
Dionysius IV Muselimes (the Muslim) (1682–1684), restored 2nd time
Parthenius IV (1684–1685) restored 4th time
James (1685–1686), restored 1st time
Dionysius IV Muselimes (the Muslim) (1686–1687), restored 3rd time
James (1687–1688), restored 2nd time
210. Callinicus II (1688)
211. Neophytus IV (1688)
Callinicus II (1689–1693), restored 1st time
Dionysius IV Muselimes (the Muslim) (1693–1694), restored 4th time
Callinicus II (1694–1702), restored 2nd time
212. Gabriel III (1702–1707)
213. Neophytus V (1707)
214. Cyprianus (1707–1709)
215. Athanasius V (1709–1711)
216. Cyril IV (1711–1713)
Cyprianus (1713–1714), restored
217. Cosmas III (1714–1716)
218. Jeremias III (1716–1726)
219. Callinicus III (1726)
220. Paisius II (1726–1732)
Jeremias III (1732–1733), restored
221. Serapheim I (1733–1734)
222. Neophytus VI (1734–1740)
Paisius II (1740–1743), restored 1st time
Neophytus VI (1743–1744), restored
Paisius II (1744–1748), restored 2nd time
223. Cyril V (1748–1751)
Paisius II (1751–1752), restored 2nd time
Cyril V (1752–1757), restored 1st time
224. Callinicus IV (1757)
225. Serapheim II (1757–1761)
226. Joannicius III (1761–1763)
227. Samuel I Chatzeres (1763–1768)
228. Meletius II (1769–1769)
229. Theodosius II (1769–1773)
Samuel I Chatzeres (1773–1774), restored
230. Sophronius II (1774–1780)
231. Gabriel IV (1780–1785)
232. Procopius (1785–1789)
233. Neophytus VII (1789–1794)
234. Gerasimus III (1794–1797)
235. St. Gregory V (1797–1798)
Neophytus VII (1798–1801), restored
236. Callinicus V (1801–1806)
St. Gregory V (1806–1808), restored 1st time
Callinicus V (1808–1809), restored
237. Jeremias IV (1809–1813)
238. Cyril VI (1813–1818)
St. Gregory V (1818–1821), restored 2nd time
239. Eugenius II (1821–1822)
240. Anthimus III (1822–1824)
241. Chrysanthus I (1824–1826)
242. Agathangelus I (1826–1830)
243. Constantius I (1830–1834)

On July 23, 1833, the Church of Greece declared itself autocephalous. It was followed by the Romanian Orthodox Church in 1864, the Bulgarian Exarchate in 1872, and the Serbian Orthodox Church in 1879, thus reducing the territorial extent of the Ecumenical Patriarchate's jurisdiction.

1834–1923 
244. Constantius II (1834–1835)
245. Gregory VI (1835–1840)
246. Anthimus IV (1840–1841)
247. Anthimus V (1841–1842)
248. Germanus IV (1842–1845)
249. Meletius III (1845)
250. Anthimus VI (1845–1848)
Anthimus IV (1848–1852), restored
Germanus IV (1852–1853), restored
Anthimus VI (1853–1855), restored 1st time
251. Cyril VII (1855–1860)
252. Joachim II (1860–1863)
253. Sophronius III (1863–1866)
Gregory VI (1867–1871), restored
Anthimus VI (1871–1873), restored 2nd time
Joachim II (1873–1878), restored
254. Joachim III (1878–1884)
255. Joachim IV (1884–1887)
256. Dionysius V (1887–1891)
257. Neophytus VIII (1891–1894)
258. Anthimus VII (1895–1896)
259. Constantine V (1897–1901)
Joachim III (1901–1912), restored
260. Germanus V (1913–1918)
vacant (1918–1921)
261. Meletius IV (1921–1923)

On July 24, 1923, the Ottoman Empire dissolved, replaced by the Republic of Turkey.

1923–present 
262. Gregory VII (1923–1924)
263. Constantine VI (1924–1925)
264. Basil III (1925–1929)
265. Photios II (1929–1935)
266. Benjamin I (1936–1946)
267. Maximus V (1946–1948)
268. Athenagoras I (1948–1972)
269. Demetrios I (1972–1991)
270. Bartholomew I (1991–present)

See also 
Ambrose
Apostolic succession
Athanasius of Alexandria
Basil of Caesarea
Constantinople
Cyril of Jerusalem
Eastern Orthodoxy
Ecumenical Patriarch of Constantinople
Eusebius of Caesarea
Gregory of Nyssa
Hilary of Poitiers
Jerome
John of Damascus
Latin Patriarch of Constantinople
List of Armenian Patriarchs of Constantinople
Nicephorus Callistus Xanthopoulos
Patriarch
Pope Gregory I
Socrates Scholasticus
Sozomen
Theodoret
Vincent of Lerins

Notes 
A selection of different spellings of certain names as seen on Patriarchate.org:
Dimitrios = Demetrios
Germanos  = Germanus
Stephanos = Stephen

Citations

External links 

Patriarchate.org, Ecumenical Patriarchate of Constantinople
EC-patr.org, List of Ecumenical Patriarchs from the official website of the Ecumenical Patriarchate

Constantinople
Patriarchs
Eastern Orthodoxy in Europe
Constantinople